In the geometry of three dimensions, a stellation extends a polyhedron to form a new figure that is also a polyhedron. The following is a list of stellations of various polyhedra.

See also
 List of Wenninger polyhedron models
 The Fifty-Nine Icosahedra

Footnotes

References
 
 
 

 
Mathematics-related lists